The ST BOOK is a subnotebook released in 1991 by Atari Corporation. It is based on the Atari STE. The ST BOOK is more portable than the previous Atari portable, the STacy, but it sacrifices several features in order to achieve this: notably the backlight, and internal floppy disc drive. 

The screen is highly reflective. It supports the 640×400 1-bit mono mode only without an external video port. It gained some popularity as being the most utterly portable full-featured computer of the day (slim, light, quiet, reliable, and with a long battery life, even by modern standards for all 5).

The ST BOOK is shipped with a modified version of TOS 2.06.

Specifications  
Model number: NST-141
 Blitter
 Character set: Atari ST character set (based on codepage 437)
 Real-time clock Lithium Battery
 Parallel: Yes (1 port)
 Serial: Yes (1 port)
 ACSI/FDD: Yes (1 port)
 Midi: Yes (2 ports)
 External keyboard
 Internal Modem: optional (used for this model's expansion port)
 Vector Pad

References

External links 
 The Atari STBook Laptop
 Atari ST BOOK, OLD-COMPUTERS.COM Museum
 Atari ST Book Practical Performance, 1993

Products introduced in 1991
Atari ST
Subnotebooks